Cerocala vermiculosa is a moth of the family Erebidae.

Distribution
It is found in southern Africa, from Zambia to South Africa, including Madagascar.

Gallery

References

External links 
 Cerocala vermiculosa in africanmoths.com

Ophiusina
Moths of Africa
Moths of Madagascar
Moths described in 1858